Martin Franklin may refer to:

 Martin Franklin (musician), leader of the ambient group Tuu
 Martin E. Franklin (born 1964), British-born, New York-based business executive